Gomphocerus is a genus of grasshoppers (Caelifera: Acrididae) in the tribe Gomphocerini. Species can be found in Europe and Asia, with one species in South America (Gomphocerus semicolor).

Species
Gomphocerus includes the following species:
Gomphocerus armeniacus Uvarov, 1931
Gomphocerus dispar Fischer von Waldheim, 1846
Gomphocerus evanescens Stål, 1861
Gomphocerus kudia Caudell, 1928
Gomphocerus licenti Chang, 1939
Gomphocerus plebejus Stål, 1861
Gomphocerus semicolor Burmeister, 1838
Gomphocerus sibiricus Linnaeus, 1767 - type species (as Gryllus sibiricus L. = Gomphocerus sibiricus sibiricus)
 Gomphocerus transcaucasicus Mistshenko, 1951

References

External links

Gomphocerinae
Acrididae genera